Springfield Township is a township in Kossuth County, Iowa, United States.

History
Springfield Township was established in 1891.

References

Townships in Kossuth County, Iowa
Townships in Iowa
1891 establishments in Iowa
Populated places established in 1891